Antares A-ONE mission was the maiden flight of Orbital Sciences Corporation' Antares launch vehicle including the ascent to space and accurate delivery of a simulated payload, the Cygnus Mass Simulator (CMS), which was launched 21 April 2013. It was launched from Pad 0A at the Mid-Atlantic Regional Spaceport (MARS), Wallops Flight Facility, Virginia. The simulated payload simulates the mass of the Cygnus cargo spacecraft.

This launch along with several other activities leading up to it, are paid milestones under NASA's Commercial Orbital Transportation Services (COTS) program.

Primary payload 
The primary payload was the Cygnus Mass Simulator. It was equipped with 22 accelerometers, 2 microphones, 12 digital thermometers, 24 thermocouples and 12 strain gages.

Secondary payloads 
Four Spaceflight Industries Inc. CubeSat nanosatellites were deployed from the dummy payload.

The secondary payloads were four CubeSats that were deployed from the CMS. Three of them were PhoneSats, 1U CubeSats built by NASA's Ames Research Center. These were named Alexander, Graham and Bell, after the Alexander Graham Bell, inventor of the telephone. The purpose of these three satellites was to demonstrate the use of smartphones as avionics in CubeSats. The fourth nanosat was a 3U CubeSat, called Dove-1, built by Cosmogia Inc. It carried a "technology development Earth imagery experiment" using the Earth's magnetic field for attitude control.

Mission timeline 
 Lift off of the Antares launch vehicle occurs two seconds after the first stage engines are ignited
 The first stage engines shut off 228 seconds after lift-off
 At 233 seconds, the first stage separates from the second
 At 317 seconds, the payload fairing is jettisoned
 At 326 seconds, the second stage's engine is ignited
 At 481 seconds, the second stage is shut off
 At 601 seconds, the Cygnus Mass Simulator separates

Gallery

See also 
 Dragon Spacecraft Qualification Unit

References

External links 

 Antares Pre-Launch "A-ONE Mission" Briefing
 Antares A-One Mission Overview
 NASA WFF mission page
 Video of Pre-Flight Press Conference - Part 1 - YouTube (NASA TV)
 Video of Pre-Flight Press Conference - Part 2 - YouTube (NASA TV)
 Video of Antares A-One being rolled out to launch pad - YouTube (NASA TV)
 Video of the launch of the Antares A-One Mission - YouTube (NASA TV)

Spacecraft launched in 2013
Cygnus (spacecraft)
Spacecraft launched by Antares rockets